Dombeya rotundifolia, the dikbas or "South African wild pear" (it is not related to pear trees), is a small deciduous tree with dark grey to blackish deeply fissured bark, found in Southern Africa and northwards to central and eastern tropical Africa. Formerly placed in the Sterculiaceae, that artificial group has now been abandoned by most authors and the plants are part of an enlarged Malvaceae.

Dombeya rotundifolia was originally described by Hochstetter. The D. rotundifolia of Bojer is now Dombeya spectabilis.

Description
Trees are normally 5–6 m tall with a single well-defined trunk, growing on deep soils, river banks and rocky places. Leaves and flower buds are densely covered in stellate hairs. One of the first species to flower in spring, often with Erythrina lysistemon. Flowers are abundant and sweet-scented, usually white but occasionally pale pink. Flowers (15–20 mm diameter) inconspicuous round fruits form at the centre of the brown, dead, persistent petals. Wood is bluish-grey, dense, hard and extremely tough, and was sought after during the era of building wagons and carriages.

Most of the cultivated dombeyas are shrubs with attractive pink or white flowers closely related to D. rotundifolia, such as Dombeya burgessiae or Dombeya autumnalis; the latter was described when its habit of flowering during autumn became apparent.

Cultivation and uses
It is drought and frost tolerant, it is popular with beekeepers due to its high nectar production that attracts a multitude of bees and butterflies. Its flowers in showy profuse displays make it a highly valued ornamental tree. It produces a good timber with a greyish-blue heartwood and suitable for woodworking. Freshly-cut timber has a strong aroma of fishmeal.

This species is host to the scale insect Lecanodiaspis tarsalis Newstead, 1917.

Gallery

See also
List of Southern African indigenous trees

References

van Wyk, B. and van Wyk, P. 2013. Field Guide to trees of Southern Africa Second Edition. Struik, Cape Town

External links

 

rotundifolia
Trees of South Africa
Flora of Mozambique
Ornamental trees
Drought-tolerant trees
Least concern plants
Afromontane flora